Phacelia nashiana is a species of phacelia known by the common name Charlotte's phacelia. It is endemic to California, where it is known only from the ecotone where the lower Sierra Nevada and Tehachapi Mountains transition into the Mojave Desert. It grows in scrub and woodland and on granite mountain slopes.

Description
It is coated in short, stiff, and gland-tipped black hairs. The leaves, which are mostly arranged around the base of the stem, have shallowly lobed oval or rounded blades on petioles a few centimeters long.

The hairy, glandular inflorescence is a one-sided curving or coiling cyme of bell-shaped flowers. Each flower is 1 to 2 centimeters long and brilliant deep blue in color with usually five small white spots above the white tubular throat. It has five protruding stamens tipped with white anthers.

See also
Plant communities with Phacelia nashiana include:
Creosote bush scrub
Pinyon-juniper woodland
Joshua Tree woodland

References

External links
Calflora Database: Phacelia nashiana (Charlotte's phacelia)
Jepson Manual Treatment of Phacelia nashiana
Phacelia nashiana — UC Photos gallery

nashiana
Endemic flora of California
Flora of the California desert regions
Flora of the Sierra Nevada (United States)
Natural history of the California chaparral and woodlands
Natural history of the Mojave Desert
Natural history of the Transverse Ranges
~
Flora without expected TNC conservation status